The 2021 SheBelieves Cup was the sixth edition of the SheBelieves Cup, an invitational women's soccer tournament held in the United States.

Featuring national teams from Canada, Brazil, Argentina, and hosts United States, it began on February 18 and ended on February 24, 2021. Argentina replaced Japan after it withdrew due to the COVID-19 pandemic.

The United States successfully defended their title, capturing their fourth title.

Format
The four invited teams played a round-robin tournament. Points awarded in the group stage followed the formula of three points for a win, one point for a draw, and zero points for a loss. A tie in points would be decided by goal differential; other tie-breakers are listed below.

Venue

* Due to the COVID-19 pandemic, attendance at games was limited.

Squads

Teams

Standings

Results
All times are local (UTC−5).

Goalscorers

References

External links
Official website

2021
2021 in women's association football
2021 in American women's soccer
February 2021 sports events in the United States
2021 in sports in Florida
Soccer in Florida